Elemir is a village located in the Zrenjanin municipality, in the Central Banat District of Serbia. It is situated in the province of Vojvodina. As of 2011 census, the village has a population of 4,338 inhabitants.

Name
In Serbian, the village is known as Elemir or Елемир, in Hungarian as Elemér and in German as Elemer.

Demographics

As of 2011 census, the village has a population of 4,338 inhabitants.

Historical population
 1869: 4,359
 1900: 4,749
 1948: 4,656
 1953: 4,757
 1961: n/a
 1971: 5,001
 1981: 4,998
 1991: 4,724
 2002: 4,690
 2011: 4,338

Ethnic groups
The ethnic composition of the village (as of 2011 census):
 Serbs = 4,158 (88.66%)
 Romani = 181 (3.86%)
 Hungarians = 93 (1.98%)
 Yugoslavs = 54 (1.15%)
 Croats = 24 (0.51%)
 Others (3.84%)

Gallery

See also
 List of places in Serbia
 List of cities, towns and villages in Vojvodina

References
Slobodan Ćurčić, Broj stanovnika Vojvodine, Novi Sad, 1996.

External links

Zrenjanin
Populated places in Serbian Banat
Populated places in Central Banat District